Erik Valdemar Bergman (24 November 1911, in Nykarleby – 24 April 2006, in Helsinki) was a composer of classical music from Finland.

Bergman's style ranged widely, from Romanticism in his early works (many of which he later prohibited from being performed) to modernism and primitivism, among other genres. He won the Nordic Council Music Prize in 1994 for his opera Det sjungande trädet.

Bergman studied at the Sibelius Academy in Helsinki and afterwards with Heinz Tiessen in Berlin and with Wladimir Vogel in Ascona. Since 1963 he taught composition at the Sibelius Academy, besides working until 1978 as a choir conductor. Bergman is considered a pioneer of modern music in Finland. Because of his training he was considered as a representative of the avant-garde; he developed for example the twelve-tone techniques of Arnold Schönberg learned from Wladimir Vogel. He composed song cycles, cantatas, pieces for piano and for organ, a guitar suite, a chamber concert for flute, clarinet, bass clarinet, violin, viola, cello, percussion and piano and further chamber works. His Requiem for a dead poet (1970) and Colori ed improvvisazioni for orchestra (1973) gave him international recognition. He is also known for his extensive choral output. His latest works include concertos for cello, violin and trumpet.

He is buried in the Hietaniemi Cemetery in Helsinki.

References

Further reading

External links
Finnish Music Information Centre article on Erik Bergman (checked 23 September 2016).
Fennica Gehrman's Bergman page with a complete opus list of his works (publisher).
Obituary of Erik Bergman in The Independent.

1911 births
2006 deaths
20th-century classical composers
21st-century classical composers
Twelve-tone and serial composers
Finnish classical composers
Finnish male classical composers
Burials at Hietaniemi Cemetery
Finnish opera composers
Male opera composers
Swedish-speaking Finns
20th-century male musicians
21st-century male musicians
20th-century Finnish composers
21st-century Finnish composers